PLI may refer to:

Pascual Liner Inc.
Performance-linked incentives
Defunct hardware and software company, Peripheral Land, Inc.
Perpetual Income & Growth Investment Trust (LSE: PLI)
Practising Law Institute
Pragmatic language impairment
PL/I ("Programming Language One")
PLI (gene)
Pli: the Warwick Journal of Philosophy
Portland–Lewiston Interurban, Maine, U.S.
 Pragmatic language impairment, an earlier term for Social Communication Disorder
 Private line interface, part of ARPANET encryption devices
 Professional liability insurance
 Program Language Interface, in Verilog
Verilog Procedural Interface or PLI 2

Politics
Independent Liberal Party (Nicaragua) or Partido Liberal Independiente
Italian Liberal Party or Partito Liberale Italiano
Italian Liberal Party (1997)

See also
Ply (disambiguation)
ISO 639:pli or Pali language
Pli selon pli (Fold by fold), a 1960 classical piece by French composer Pierre Boulez